Stephen Cronin (born 13 October 1995) is an Irish Gaelic footballer who plays as a left corner-back for the Cork senior team.

References

1995 births
Living people
Nemo Rangers Gaelic footballers
Cork inter-county Gaelic footballers